Dulwich Hill, an electoral district of the Legislative Assembly in the Australian state of New South Wales had two incarnations, from 1913 until 1920 and from 1927 until 1968.


Election results

Elections in the 1960s

1965

1962

Elections in the 1950s

1959

1956

1953 by-election

1953

1950

Elections in the 1940s

1947

1944

1941

Elections in the 1930s

1938

1935

1932

1930

Elections in the 1920s

1927

Elections in the 1910s

1917

1913

References 

New South Wales state electoral results by district